{{Infobox football club season
|club               = Shelbourne
|season             = 2023
|image              = Shelbourne_players_2023.jpg
|image_size         = 
|alt                = 
|caption            = Shelbourne at Tolka Park in February 2023
|chrtitle           = Chairman
|chairman           = Andrew Doyle
|mgrtitle           = Head Coach
|manager            = Damien Duff
|stdtitle           = 
|stadium            = Tolka Park, Dublin
|league             = League of Ireland Premier Division
|league result      = 5th
|cup1             = FAI Cup
|cup1 result      = 1st Round
|cup2             = League of Ireland Cup
|cup2 result      =
|cup3             = Leinster Senior Cup
|cup3 result      = 4th round|league topscorer = Leavy, JR Wilson, Moylan (1)
|season topscorer = Leavy, JR Wilson, Molloy (1)
|highest attendance = 4,371 v Shamrock Rovers 10 March 2023
|lowest attendance  = 3,424 v Drogheda United 17 February 2023
|average attendance = 
|largest win        = 2-0 v Cork City 17 March 2023
|largest loss       = 0-1 v St. Patrick's Athletic 24 February 2023
| pattern_la1 = _shelbourne_2023h
| pattern_b1 = _shelbourne23h
| pattern_ra1 = _shelbourne_2023h
| pattern_sh1 = _shelbourne23h
| pattern_so1 = _shelbourne23h
| leftarm1 = 
| body1 = 
| rightarm1 = 
| shorts1 = 
| socks1 =
| pattern_la2 = _shelbourne23a
| pattern_b2 = _shelbourne23a
| pattern_ra2 = _shelbourne23a
| leftarm2 = 
| body2 =
| rightarm2 = 
| shorts2 =
| socks2 = 
| pattern_so2 = _shelbourne23a
| pattern_sh2 = _shelbourne23a
|updated            = 22:15 13 March 2023 (UTC)
|prevseason         = 2022
|nextseason         = 2024
}}
The 2023 Shelbourne F.C. season is the club's 128th season in existence and their second back in the League of Ireland Premier Division following promotion from the League of Ireland First Division in 2021.

First team squad

 Players' ages are as of the opening day of the 2023 season.Transfers
Transfers in

Loans in

Transfers out

Loans out

Competitions

 Overview 

League of Ireland

 Results summary 

Results by matchday

Matches

Leinster Senior Cup

Statistics

Appearances and goals

 Players listed in italics left the club mid-season
Source: RedsStats1895

 Goalscorers As of match played 17 March 2023Players listed in italics left the club mid-season
Source: RedsStats1985

 Discipline As of match played 17 March 2023''

 Players listed in italics left the club mid-season.
 Source: RedsStats1895

Kit

The 2023 Home and Away shirts were released on 17 December 2022. Culligan replaces Hampton Homes as front of shirt sponsor in a deal running until the end of 2026. 

|
|

Key: H = Home, A = Away, N = Neutral

References

External links

 
Shelbourne
Shelbourne F.C. seasons
Shelbourne